Werner Bopp (* 12 February 1924; † 22 October 2006) was a Swiss footballer who played nearly his entire career for FC Basel. He played mainly in the position as defender.

Football career
Between the years 1944 and 1960 Bopp played a total of 496 games for Basel scoring a total of 20 goals. 321 of these games were in the Nationalliga A, 43 in the Swiss Cup and 132 were friendly games. He scored 13 goal in the domestic league, two in the Swiss Cup and the other five were scored during the test games. 

In his first season Bopp played in three test games before he played his debut in domestic league game on 18 March 1945 against Lausanne Sports. Basel were relegated at the end of this season, but they achieved immediate promotion the following season. Bopp scored his first goal for Basel in the 1946–47 season on 21 June 1947 in the 5–1 victory against Cantonal Neuchatel.

His biggest success was the championship title in Basel's 1952–53 season. In addition to this title, Bopp also reached the Swiss Cup final with his club in Basel's 1946–47 season. They won the final 3–0 against Lausanne Sports. In the Stadion Neufeld on 7 April 1947 Paul Stöcklin scoring all three goals. Bopp moved to local rivals Nordstern Basel for the 1960–61 season and at the end this season he ended his football career.

Titles and Honours
FC Basel
 Swiss Cup winner: 1946–47
 Swiss League Champion: 1952–53

See also
 List of FC Basel players
 List of FC Basel seasons

References

Sources
 Rotblau: Jahrbuch Saison 2017/2018. Publisher: FC Basel Marketing AG. 
 Die ersten 125 Jahre. Publisher: Josef Zindel im Friedrich Reinhardt Verlag, Basel. 
 Verein "Basler Fussballarchiv" Homepage
 1946–47 at RSSSF
 1952–53 at RSSSF

FC Basel players
FC Nordstern Basel players
Swiss men's footballers
Association football defenders
1924 births
2006 deaths
Sportspeople from the canton of Fribourg